Siegfried Dockner (born 22 July 1956) is an Austrian biathlete. He competed in the 20 km individual event at the 1980 Winter Olympics.

References

1956 births
Living people
Austrian male biathletes
Olympic biathletes of Austria
Biathletes at the 1980 Winter Olympics
Sportspeople from Styria
People from Murau District